Ahh...The Name Is Bootsy, Baby! is a funk album by Bootsy's Rubber Band, released on January 15, 1977. It reached number one on Billboard magazine's Top R&B/Soul albums chart, the first P-Funk release to achieve this goal. The album was produced by George Clinton and William "Bootsy" Collins and arranged by Bootsy and Casper (names William Collins uses to refer to his various roles ).

Reception

Bootsy's second album is widely considered his best: the Motherpage gives it five-star ratings. Similar to most of Bootsy's other work, it is divided between dance tracks and slow jams. The song "The Pinocchio Theory" inspired the George Clinton creation Sir Nose D'voidoffunk (see P-Funk mythology: the song says if you fake the funk, your nose will grow, and Sir Nose fakes the funk).

The title track was inspiration for Eazy-E's 1988 track We Want Eazy, with Bootsy making a cameo appearance in the song's musical video.

Track listing 
Side I / El Uno – A Friendly Boo
 "Ahh...the Name is Bootsy, Baby" (William Collins, George Clinton, Maceo Parker) – (6:52)
 "The Pinocchio Theory" (William Collins, George Clinton) – (6:08) (released as a single-Warner Bros. 8328)
 "Rubber Duckie" (William Collins, George Clinton, Garry Shider) – (3:18) (released as the b-side to "The Pinocchio Theory")
 "Preview Side Too" (William Collins, George Clinton, Gary Cooper) – (0:56)
Side II / Un Dos – Geepieland Music
 "What's a Telephone Bill?" (William Collins, George Clinton, Gary Cooper) – (5:58)
 "Munchies for Your Love" (William Collins, George Clinton, Gary Cooper, Garry Shider) – (9:39)
 "Can't Stay Away" (William Collins, George Clinton) – (5:28) (released as a single-Warner Bros. 8403)
 "Reprise: We Want Bootsy" (William Collins, George Clinton, Maceo Parker) – (0:20)

Personnel 
Phelps "Catfish" Collins, Garry Shider, Michael Hampton, Glenn Goins, Bootsy Collins - guitar
Frankie "Kash" Waddy, Jerome Brailey, Gary "Mudbone" Cooper, Bootsy Collins - drums
Joel "Razor-Sharp" Johnson, Bernie Worrell - keyboards
Bootsy Collins, Casper (William Earl Collins)- bass
Fred Wesley, Maceo Parker, Rick Gardner, Richard "Kush" Griffith - Horny Horns
Randy Brecker, Michael Brecker - horns
Gary "Mudbone" Cooper, Robert "P-Nut" Johnson - "front ground" vocals
Fred Wesley, Bootsy Collins - horn arrangements

Charts

Singles

See also
List of number-one R&B albums of 1977 (U.S.)

References

External links
 Bootsy's Rubber Band-Ahh...The Name Is Bootsy, Baby! at Discogs
 Bootsy's Rubber Band-Ahh...The Name Is Bootsy, Baby! on The Motherpage

1977 albums
Bootsy Collins albums
Warner Records albums